Phaedon Gizikis (16 June 1917 – 26 July 1999) was a Greek army general, and the second and last President of Greece under the Junta, from 1973 to 1974.

Early life and military career 
Born in Volos, Greece, Gizikis was a career Hellenic Army officer. His service number was 21756. He graduated from the Hellenic Military Academy in 1939, achieving the rank of second lieutenant in artillery, and participated in the Greco-Italian War and the Greek Civil War. In 1967, he supported the Georgios Papadopoulos coup d'état and received a number of senior military posts during the dictatorship that followed.

Later life 
He was given the title of President of the Republic on 25 November 1973, after Papadopoulos was ousted by Dimitrios Ioannidis as head of the regime in an internal power struggle. Three days later, he was promoted to full General (Stratigos), a decision he signed himself.  While serving as president, following the supported coup in Cyprus, he would detract from open confrontation with Turkish forces during the invasion of Cyprus. Ioannidis would later blame Gizikis and other hesitant leaders as the reason for the Greek loss. As president he gave the task of forming a new government, following the collapse of the Junta, to Constantine Karamanlis. After the fall of the dictatorship in 1974, he retained his post for four months pro tempore, until a new constitution could be enacted during metapolitefsi; he was then replaced by Michail Stasinopoulos.

Gizikis retired from the army in 1974, on the same day he resigned from his position as head of state. In 1976, a military judicial council dropped proceedings against him and 88 other former officers charged with treason and mutiny for collaborating with the former junta. 

He died on 26 July 1999 at the NIMTS military hospital in Athens.

References

1917 births
1999 deaths
20th-century presidents of Greece
Leaders of the Greek junta
Hellenic Army generals
Leaders who took power by coup
Presidents of Greece
People from Volos
Heads of government who were later imprisoned